The E.N.D. World Tour was the third concert tour by American hip hop group Black Eyed Peas, in support of their fifth studio album The E.N.D. (2009). The tour began in Japan on September 15, 2009, with shows also performed in Australia and New Zealand in 2009. The group toured in North America starting in February 2010, with dates also planned for Europe starting in Dublin, Ireland in May. The group performed 2 shows in Paradise, Nevada at the end of 2009 as a warm up to their extensive North American tour. The tour was also expected to reach South America and more parts of Asia during 2010. It is the group's biggest tour production-wise to date, with the group's female vocalist Fergie stating that they are "trying to up [their] game" and the shows will "utilize a lot of the technology that's out there". The E.N.D. World Tour was backed by presenting sponsor BlackBerry, and Bacardi as the official spirit of the tour.

Personnel
THE BLACK EYED PEAS
 will.i.am 
 apl.de.ap
 Taboo
 Fergie 
BAND (BUCKY JONSON)
 Printz Board – keyboards, trumpet, and bass
 George Pajon – lead guitars
 Tim Izo – rhythm guitars, sax, flute, clarinet, MPC, keyboards
 Keith Harris – drums, percussion, keyboards
SPECIAL GUESTS
 Slash - guitars on, "Fergie and Slash Solo"
 Ludacris - vocals on, "Glamorous"
DJ
 DJ POETNAMELIFE – DJ
 DJ Ammo – DJ
DANCERS
 Brandee Stephens
 Nikki Delecia
 Julianne Waters
 Nina Kripas
 Marilyn Ortiz
 Jessica Castro

Opening acts

LMFAO (Oceania and North America)
Ludacris (North America)
David Guetta (Barcelona, Washington, D.C., New York City, Guadalajara, Mexico City & São Paulo)
Prototype (selected North America Dates)
Cheryl Cole (Europe)
Jason Derülo (Canada Dates)
B.o.B (selected North America Dates)
T-Pain (selected North America Dates)
K'naan (Quebec City)
Down with Webster (Sarnia)
Faithless (Athens)
Timbalada (Salvador)
Toni Garrido (Rio de Janeiro)
Tomate (Belo Horizonte)
Yolanda Be Cool (Argentina)
Movimiento Original (Chile)
DJ Leandro (Peru)

Set list

Shows

Notes

Additional notes
February 12, 2010 in Nashville, during will.i.am's DJ set, his power was cut and he was lowered to the main stage. Stagehands gave him a new mic, however he made motions, indicating to the audience that the microphone was not working. After several chants and stomps from the audience, the show resumed with Now Generation about 3 minutes later. will.i.am apologized (pointing out the irony of "The Energy Never Dies" and how it did) throughout the remainder of the show.
March 9, 2010 in Auburn Hills, after will.i.am's DJ set, Kid Rock performed "All Summer Long" with Fergie, Taboo, and apl.de.ap.
March 13, 2010 in Chicago, after will.i.am's DJ set, Fergie and Slash rose to the stage to perform "Sweet Child O Mine" and "Beautiful Dangerous" together. They performed these two songs as well at their Los Angeles concerts on March 29 and 30.

Recordings

The E.N.D. World Tour LIVE: Presented By Blackberry
The official website released a statement February 12 reading: NCM Fathom and AEG Live Team Up Again to Present an Exclusive One-Night Concert Performance with Behind-the-Scenes Footage Broadcast LIVE to Nearly 500 Select Movie Theaters... The Black Eyed Peas are getting the party started across the country on The E.N.D. World Tour, presented by BlackBerry and will rock the big screen as their concert performance from Los Angeles is transmitted LIVE nationwide on Tuesday, March 30.  Broadcast from STAPLES Center to nearly 500 select movie theaters across America, The Black Eyed Peas: The E.N.D. World Tour LIVE Presented by BlackBerry event will feature a 30-minute exclusive program for movie theater audiences, including behind-the-scenes footage and band interviews.

Where Is the Love? (Reprise)
At every show there is a reprise to Where Is the Love?, in which the lights are cut and the audience gets to sing along to the song. This portion (sometimes the entire song and reprise) has been recorded and posted on Dipdive several times.

will.i.am's BBMe Freestyle
will.i.am's Freestyle from most dates are posted in the same fashion of the Where Is the Love? recordings on Dipdive.

Missing You (Music Video)

Don't Stop the Party (music video)
The music video, which is directed by Ben Mor, features on stage and backstage footage of the group during their 'The E.N.D. World Tour' in Brazil, last year and was released to iTunes and YouTube/VEVO on May 10, 2011.

Beside live footage of the tour, music video also features panoramic shoots of Brazilian landscapes and city life. Closing section of the video documents a visit to a Brazilian record shop, during which close-ups of records by José Roberto Bertrami, Afrika Bambaataa & The Soulsonic Force, Carlos Malcolm and Di Melo are shown.

References 

2009 concert tours
2010 concert tours
Black Eyed Peas concert tours